The 2004 Tipperary Senior Hurling Championship was the 114th staging of the Tipperary Senior Hurling Championship since its establishment by the Tipperary County Board in 1887. The knock-out stage of the new-look league-championship began on 5 September 2004 and ended on 10 October 2004.

Toomevara were the defending champions.

On 10 October 2004, Toomevara won the championship after a 4-12 to 2-12 defeat of combination side Éire Óg-Golden-Kilfeacle in the final  at Semple Stadium. It was their 19th championship title overall and their second title in succession.

External links

 The County Senior Hurling Championship (2004)

References

Tipperary Senior Hurling Championship
Tipperary